NyxAir OÜ is an Estonian regional airline headquartered in Tallinn operating scheduled and charter passenger and cargo flights.

History
NyxAir was founded in 2017 and on 7 June 2018, the Estonian Transport Agency issued its Air Operator Certificate (AOC).

Destinations 
The airline mainly performs short-term charters, but has also in 2020 and 2021 won government procurements and wet-lease contracts to fly domestic flights in Estonia, Finland and Sweden. In Estonia, the company started flights between Tallinn and Kuressaare on the island Saaremaa in December 2020. In Finland (since May 2021) the company runs flights from Helsinki to Jakobstad - Kokkola, Kemi and Jyväskylä. The company has also flown domestic flights in Sweden on behalf of Air Leap. From March 2022 it flies from Stockholm-Bromma to Kristianstad and Trollhättan on behalf of local companies.

Fleet

Nyxair's fleet consists of the following aircraft:

2 ATR 42-500
7 Saab 340
4 Saab 2000

References

External links

Airlines of Estonia